Spencer is a suburb of the Central Coast region of New South Wales, Australia. It is located on the north bank of the Hawkesbury River just upstream of that river's confluence with Mangrove Creek. Spencer is part of the  local government area.

Geography
Spencer is bounded by the Hawkesbury River to the south and west and Mangrove Creek to the east. Despite the relatively short distance from the Sydney-Newcastle Freeway as the crow flies, a boat across Mangrove Creek significantly reduces the distance to be travelled.

History

Early British explorers stepped onto a "marshy outcrop" here whilst exploring the East Coast of Australia, and a monument commemorates this, near the kids playground and public toilet.

Spencer is a township presumed to be named for the Parish in which it is situated. Originally this area was known as Fernleigh. The true name origin of Spencer is unclear, but it is believed to be named after George John Spencer, second Earl Spencer (1758–1834), who was first Lord of the admiralty in 1794, and who held this position until 1810. He was a mentor of Lord Nelson, and oversaw many of the Royal Navy's victories over the French.

Economy
The economy is rural and farming and fishing are the area's main sources of income. Tourism is also growing and based around the history and scenery of the area.

References

External links
 link Gosford City Council – Search for Articles about Spencer

Suburbs of the Central Coast (New South Wales)